Leroy Charles Griffith (born March 26, 1932) is an American theater and nightclub proprietor, former Broadway theater producer, and film producer.  He has owned, leased, or operated more than 70 adult entertainment theaters across the United States, dating from the burlesque era of the 1950s to present day nightclubs. During burlesque's heyday, he was a prolific producer of live stage shows featuring showgirls, strippers, comedians, and other stars of the era.

His business endeavors in the adult entertainment industry have, for decades, put him at odds with restrictive municipalities, and he has taken legal action, often successfully, to be able to operate his establishments.

Early life

Griffith was born in Poplar Bluff, Missouri to Floyd R. and Stella Griffith. His father was a theater owner.  The younger Griffith began as a projectionist, cashier, and usher at a local theater in his hometown.  At 17, he left for St. Louis and a job working concessions at the Grand Burlesque Theater for East Coast-based theater concessions magnate Oscar Markovich.  At the Grand, Griffith started as a "candy butcher," hawking candy and trinkets to audiences before and during intermission.  "In those days," he said in a 1993 interview, "they had probably 30 people in the cast, a chorus line, an orchestra, two comics, a singer, a vaudeville act, and then five exotic dancers. It was a good show."

Griffith discovered that any profit to be made was not from the show itself but from the concession stand:  "That's where I was.  In between acts, the pitchman would sell prize packages, candy, stuff like that. Concessions was where the real money was, just like it is with regular movies today."   After working his way up to concessions manager, Griffith began saving money, his eye set on greater aspirations.

Military service

In 1955, Griffith was drafted into the armed services.  While stationed at Elmendorf Air Force Base in Anchorage, Alaska, he worked with Bob Hope's USO show (featuring Jerry Colonna, Mickey Mantle, and Ginger Rogers, among others) when Hope was on tour there in December 1956.

After an early discharge, Griffith acquired his first theater, the Star, in Portland, Ore.  After a limited operation of a Kansas City, Mo., restaurant and another period of short-term employment with Markovich, he opened a theater in Detroit.  He was in his mid-twenties.

Career

Theater and club owner
Identifying "legitimate" theaters that were going out of business, Griffith began acquiring them. "These places would go under," he said in a 1993 interview, "and I'd go in and take over and make them successful with an adult policy."   He soon acquired theaters throughout the United States.

South Florida (1961-   )

On a visit to Miami Beach in 1961, Griffith noticed the Paris Theater at 550 Washington Avenue was for sale. He leased it, then bought it, originally staging burlesque, including featuring Tempest Storm.  But back in the early '60s, Griffith didn't call it "burlesque"; doing so would have been against local law. "You couldn't even use the word," he recalled in a 1993 interview. "I had one big stage show called 'The Top Stars of Burlesque,' with Blaze Starr and all these people. I told the city, 'It's not burlesque. It's the top stars of burlesque. There's no law against the people of burlesque.' The city decided they'd fix me by charging me $1,000 for a special license to do the show. I said fine. I was going to have to pay $1,600 for a regular permit anyway."

Griffith continued to open new venues throughout South Florida, from Broward County in the north to Key West in the south. In addition to bringing in live acts, he began showing movies.  He also began producing films and exhibiting them in his theaters.

A young Mickey Rourke once worked for Griffith as a cashier and projectionist at one of his Miami Beach theaters.

Film producer

Griffith produced Bell, Bare and Beautiful (1963), Lullaby of Bareland (1964), Mundo depravados (1967), and My Third Wife, George (1968).

Film appearances

Griffith played brief cameo parts in some of his films. His recollections of the burlesque era are featured in Leslie Zemeckis's 2010 documentary, Behind the Burly Q.

Broadway producer

This Was Burlesque, a revue conceived by and starring burlesque star Ann Corio, was staged at Griffith's Hudson Theater on Broadway during the 1964–65 season.  It went on to tour across the U.S. in various forms over the next two decades.

Griffith also produced Hello Burlesque, a live stage show featuring showgirl Julie Taylor, "Miss Sex 5th Avenue."

Griffith's theaters and clubs

Theaters he has owned and operated, been an ownership partner in, leased, and/or managed include these:

Note: Click the "sort" icon at the head of each column to view data in alphabetical order.

Controversies

vs. The City of Hialeah, Fla.

Griffith turned Hialeah's Atlas Cinema into an X-rated theater in August 1985, outraging Mayor Raul Martinez.  "The issue is not censorship," Martinez said at the time. "It is morality. They will bring in derelicts, the sick of mind. They're like herpes -- wherever they go, everybody gets infected. We don't need that."

The day after opening, in a pre-emptive strike, Griffith's lawyers sued the city, charging that a Hialeah zoning ordinance banning porn cinemas within 500 feet of residences was unconstitutional.  His court challenge failed and the theater was ordered shut down.

vs. The City of Miami

In 1987, city officials confiscated movie projectors, a refreshment stand, and other property from Griffith's Pussycat Theater.  He had just won a court fight with the city over his right to exhibit a film called Three Ripening Cherries.  He was accused of owing more than $50,000 in fines dating back to 1978. The city bungled part of the collection process in a technical snafu, so Griffith ended up accountable for only $21,400.

An auction of his theater equipment was conducted to satisfy that debt. The winning bid came in at $13,500, from Griffith himself, effectively reducing his penalties by another $8,000.

vs. Miami-Dade County

Between 1976 and 1987, the Pussycat was raided 18 times.  Efforts by the county to charge him with a felony for screening two obscene movies within 5 years collapsed when Griffith's attorney pointed out that too much time had elapsed between incidents. When prosecutors then indicated they might like to charge him with a simple misdemeanor for the more recent indiscretion (showing the film American Babylon), his attorney argued it had been two years since that film had been confiscated, thus denying Griffith his right to a speedy trial. The judge agreed and threw out the case.

In April 1987, the Miami-Dade State Attorney's Office filed a ten-page complaint demanding that the Pussycat be shut down. This time the charge was brought under the Florida Racketeer Influenced and Corrupt Organization Act.  Because the Pussycat had been raided 18 times in eleven years, prosecutors contended, it must be an ongoing criminal enterprise. "That's not what the RICO Act was put in for," Griffith retorted.  A judge agreed and dismissed the complaint.

vs. The City of Miami Beach

In late 1989, after the cities of Fort Lauderdale and North Miami Beach outlawed alcohol in establishments featuring nude entertainers, Miami Beach officials—led by Mayor Alex Daoud—feared strip club operators would gravitate to their city and that Miami Beach "would be overrun with sex-mad drunken men and immoral, naked women."

The imminent debut of the Gold Club, whose owners had intended to introduce nudity and alcohol in their new building on 5th Street, spurred the City Commission to pass local legislation prohibiting such a mix.

Griffith announced that if the Gold Club was allowed to open with liquor and nudity, he would move his hard-core films from the Gayety Theater (then known as Deja Vu) to the Roxy, which then was showing second-run movies for general audiences.  In turn, he would convert the Gayety into an upscale nude bar to compete with the Gold Club.

Daoud said, "We don't have to sit idly by and watch [adult clubs] open up.  It would be detrimental to the growth of our city that has been developing so nicely."

The city passed an ordinance in January 1990 prohibiting not only nudity and alcohol sharing the same room, but also banning any nudity near schools and churches.  The Gold Club did open with nude dancers, but soon folded under the handicap of the no-liquor policy.

Griffith, meanwhile, successfully changed the Gayety into the all-nude, alcohol-free Deja Vu (without local competition), and turned the Roxy into an adult theater, Club Madonna.  Daoud was removed from office a year later after being implicated on unrelated corruption charges for which he was later convicted and imprisoned. Griffith and Daoud have since become close friends.

Since the early 2000s, Griffith has been involved in legal disputes with the City of Miami Beach over its 1989/1990 ordinances banning the sale of alcohol in any establishment featuring nudity.  He sued several city officials in federal court, alleging they conspired to deny him a fair hearing before the City Commission after he sued the wife of one commissioner for libel, slander, and defamation after she waged a campaign against him, claiming, among other things, that he was a tax cheat.

Philanthropy

Griffith, for years, hosted annual shows at his Carib Theater benefiting the Miami Beach Police and Firemen's Benevolent Association.  The city's police softball teams and the Miami Beach Policemen's Relief and Pension Fund have also been beneficiaries of his charitable giving.  In 1997, the MBPD recognized Griffith for his donation of bicycles to the department, for use by its bike patrol officers.

Nationally syndicated gossip writer Earl Wilson thanked Griffith in a December 1965 column "for his welcome Christmas check for the 'Earl Wilson Help the Needy Fund' which arrived just in time to aid some deserving folk."

Work

Stage productions
 This Was Burlesque (1964) - producer
 Hello Burlesque - producer

Filmography
 Bell, Bare and Beautiful (1963) - producer, writer, actor (Theater Manager)
 Lullaby of Bareland (1964) - producer
 The Case of the Stripping Wives (1966) - producer
 Mundo depravados (1967) - producer
 My Third Wife, George (1968) - producer
 Behind the Burly Q (documentary, 2010) - interview subject

Awards and recognitions
 1970s: Key to the City of Miami Beach (awarded by Mayor Harold Rosen)
 1970s:  Recognition for "unselfish contributions" to the annual All-Star show (Miami Beach Police and Firemen's Benevolent Association)
 1997: Recognition for "outstanding dedication and service" to the Washington Avenue Bike Unit (Miami Beach Police Department)
 1999: Recognition for "generous support" for the Miami Beach Police softball teams (Miami Beach Police Department)
 2000: Recognition for "generosity and continued support" (Miami Beach Policemen's Relief and Pension Fund)
 2007: Best Adult Club in Miami Beach (Club Madonna), The Miami SunPost

References

External links

 
 "Behind The Burly Q"
 Club Madonna
 Sex, Money, Politics in Miami Beach (CBS4 I-Team report)
 Gold Rush Cabaret
 The World of Leroy Griffith blog

1932 births
American entertainment industry businesspeople
Film producers from Missouri
American pornographers
American theatre managers and producers
Living people
Nightclub owners
People from Poplar Bluff, Missouri
People from Miami Beach, Florida
Businesspeople from Miami
Film producers from Florida
People from Miami-Dade County, Florida